Joseph "Flip" Nuñez (August 27, 1931 – November 3, 1995) was an American jazz pianist, composer, and vocalist of Filipino descent.

Solo recording
My Own Time and Space, (Catalyst), 1976

Performance credits
 Beverly Kelly, Bev Kelly In Person, 1960
 Jon Hendricks, In Person at the Trident, 1963
 Azteca, Azteca, 1972
 Azteca, Pyramid of the Moon, 1973
 Ira Nepus, Trombone Feeling, 1979
 John Handy, Centerpiece, 1989

References

External links
 Theodore S. Gonzalves, ALL THE THINGS YOU ARE - Listening to Joseph Flip Nuñez, Jazz 'n Academe 5.
 Theo Gonzalves, Novemberly Liner Notes - Our Own Voice Literary Ezine: Filipinos in the Diaspora, July 2004, Jazz 'n Academe 6.
 Nancy King biography mentions Flip Nuñez as one of her influences.

American jazz pianists
American male pianists
1995 deaths
1931 births
20th-century American pianists
20th-century American male musicians
American male jazz musicians